Theophano may refer to:

Theophano of Athens, consort of Staurakios (reigned 811)
Theophano Martinakia, first consort of Leo VI the Wise (reigned 886 – 912)
Theophano (born Anastaso), consort of Romanos II (reigned 959 – 963) and Nikephoros II (reigned 963 – 969)
Theophanu, consort of Otto II, Holy Roman Emperor (reigned 967 – 983)
Theophanu, Abbess of Essen from 1039–1058, granddaughter of Empress Theophanu and Otto II

Theophoric names
Greek feminine given names